Candomblé Bantu (also called Candomblé Batuque or Angola) is one of the major branches (nations) of the Candomblé religious belief system. It developed in the Portuguese Empire among Kongo and Mbundu slaves who spoke Kikongo and Kimbundu languages. The supreme and creative god is Nzambi or Nzambi a Mpungu. Below him are the Jinkisi or Minkisi, deities of Bantu mythology. These deities resemble Olorun and the other orishas of the Yoruba religion. Minkisi is a Kongo language term: it is the plural of Nkisi, meaning "receptacle". Akixi comes from the Kimbundu language term Mukixi.

Etymology 

The word "Bantu" means "people"; it is a combination of ba, a plural noun marker and -ntu, meaning "person". "Banto" was a generic term used by the Portuguese in Brazil to describe people who spoke Bantu languages.

Pantheon

Nzambi is the "sovereign master"; he created the earth, then withdrew from the world. Nzambi Mpungu remains responsible for rainfall and health.
Aluvaiá (also Bombo Njila, Pambu Njila, Nzila, Mujilo, Mavambo, Vangira, Njila, Maviletango) is an intermediary between human beings and other Nkisi; he is additionally the protector of the houses.
Nkosi Mukumbe (also Hoji Mukumbi, Panzu, Xauê) is the Nkisi of roads, agriculture, and iron. He is associated with Ogun in Yoruba religion.
Mutalambô 
Gongobira
Katendê 
Loango
Kaviungo 
Angorô and Angoroméa
Kitembo 
Matamba
Kisimbi 
Kaitumbá
Zumbarandá
Wunje
Lembá Dilê

References

See also

 Candomblé Ketu
 Candomblé Jejé
 Kongo religion

External links
 Ritos de Angola 

Candomblé
Bantu mythology
Kongo culture